Lieutenant Martin Soap is a fictional police officer, and ally of the Marvel Comics antihero the Punisher. He was created by Garth Ennis and Steve Dillon, and first appeared in The Punisher Vol. 5, #2 (May 2000).

Publication history 

Martin Soap debuted in The Punisher Vol. 5, #2 and appeared in every subsequent installment of the series up to Issue #12. The character was then featured in seventeen issues of the following volume, with his final appearance being in The Punisher Vol. 6, #37.

Fictional character biography 

Moments after his birth, Soap was dropped on his head by a nurse. He was then abandoned at an orphanage in Dunmore, New Jersey, where he remained from 1971 to 1987. Soap was bullied by the staff and the other children, and during one unsuccessful attempt at running away he was inspired to become a police officer by the alcoholic detective who brought him back to the orphanage. Soap rose through the ranks of the NYPD to become a detective himself, despite all of his cases being botched by an improbable turn of events, such as a judge being declared insane, or an entire jury taking ecstasy.

When the Punisher resurfaces and declares war on the Gnucci crime family, Soap is assigned to the Punisher Task Force, a sinecure with only one other member, a neurotic behavioral psychologist named Buddy Plugg. After Soap criticizes his profile of the Punisher, the distraught Plugg hangs himself in his and Soap's shared office.

Soap is later approached by Molly von Richthofen, a lieutenant, and the sole member of another pointless task force, one supposedly dedicated to dismantling the Gnucci family. The two join forces, and stake out Ma Gnucci's mansion, intending to step in and arrest whoever remains after the Punisher inevitably lays siege to the building. Over the course of their investigation, Soap and Molly become friends, and remain so even after Molly shoots down Soap's attempt to pursue a romantic relationship with her by revealing that she is a lesbian. After killing Ma Gnucci and destroying her mansion, the Punisher confronts Soap and Molly, and offers them Ma's compromising photographs of the mayor and the police commissioner in exchange for all of the information that the NYPD has pertaining to the Vigilante Squad. With the photographs, Soap is able to blackmail his way into becoming the new commissioner; while Soap is basking in his good fortune, a bird defecates on his head.

Soap is demoted back to detective and once again assigned to the Punisher Task Force after pictures of him soliciting a prostitute surface. The dismayed Soap attempts suicide, but is stopped by the Punisher, who convinces Soap to become his informant within the NYPD. After Soap kills serial killer John "Bubba" Prong in self-defense, Soap is promoted to Lieutenant.

Soap is later taken hostage by hired goons working for ruthless tabloid reporter Chuck Self, who forces the Punisher to take Self along with him while the Punisher spends a night killing gangsters and petty criminals. If Castle fails to comply with Self's orders, Self will text-message his men to kill Soap. During the course of being chased by gang members and Mafiosos, Self is injured several times while the Punisher himself remained unscathed. Self is later killed by accidentally falling into a wood chipper, and Castle returns to save Soap by killing Self's thugs. The Punisher leaves Self's mangled corpse on the hood of his own car, then Castle and Soap walk away.

Soap is seen as a bar regular, falsely believing the bartender, Kevin, to be one of his true friends. Kevin is amused by Soap's lack of awareness when choosing dates, including, but not limited to, a killer ex-con, a transvestite and a woman Kevin believes is Soap's own long-lost mother. When Soap nearly kills himself with a gun in the men's bathroom, Kevin intervenes and Soap believes that it's out of concern for his well-being. But when Kevin makes a snarky comment because he didn't want a mess and preferred Soap to kill himself at his home, Soap snaps at Kevin, threatens him with his gun and terrifies him before storming off, having found self-confidence in himself. Soap tries to arrest the Punisher, but fails to stop him. Soap then becomes despondent; Castle then tells Soap when things aren't getting better, to "just go".

Soap leaves the NYPD, moves to Los Angeles and becomes a porn star. Up to that point, he had simply been unaware that he has large genitals.

Other versions

Marvel Noir 

In the Marvel Noir universe, Soap is a competent NYPD Detective investigating the murder of Frank Castelione, and the murders committed by Frank's son, Frank Castelione, Jr. (who became the Punisher). The case is declared closed when Frank, Jr. kills the Russian, and makes it look like he was the Punisher. Despite there being circumstantial evidence of a frame-up, Soap is content, and obeys his superior's orders to not continue his investigation of the Punisher.

In other media

Film 

 Soap appears in the 2008 film Punisher: War Zone, played by Dash Mihok. He is portrayed as a clumsy and overly self-important man, with a degree in behavioral psychology and almost no aptitude for actually confronting criminals (there are several scenes where he is shown fumbling with his own pistol). As a joke, his superiors assign him to the Punisher Task Force, a meaningless sinecure which consists solely of Soap, since the NYPD is fully in sympathy with the Punisher's actions, but has to cosmetically appear as though it is trying to discourage vigilantism. Soap is partnered with Paul Budiansky, an FBI agent fixated on apprehending the Punisher, who had killed an undercover agent by mistake. Midway through the film, it is revealed that Soap is actually one of the Punisher's allies, feeding him information on his various targets. By the time Budiansky has figured this out, he has realized how evil the criminals they are up against are, and how powerless the "system" is to punish them.  Soap and Budiansky both assist the Punisher in rescuing the dead agent's family from Jigsaw. In the aftermath, Soap starts to walk the Punisher home, beginning an unsolicited lecture on the benefits of mercy and rehabilitation instead of outright execution - but halts when he is menaced by a mugger, whom the Punisher kills.

Video games 
 Martin Soap appears in the 2004 Punisher video game, voiced by Michael Gough. In the game, he and Molly von Richthofen interrogate the captured Punisher on Ryker's Island before John Saint/Jigsaw leads a breakout thanks to his Yakuza gang. Flashbacks reveal that Soap is secretly allied with the Punisher, regularly forwarding him information about various criminals. In one level, the Punisher enters a bar in order to kill Mafioso Bobbie Gnucci (son of Ma Gnucci) and his entourage. Soap is present, but misses the shootout due to being in the restroom vomiting, partly from alcohol consumption, and partly due to fear of Gnucci's thugs. Soap exits the restroom after the Punisher leaves the premises, sees the mess, and proclaims, "Damn it, Castle, this was my favorite bar!"

References

External links 
 Martin Soap at Comicvine
 Martin Soap at Marvel Wikia
 

Characters created by Garth Ennis
Comics characters introduced in 2000
Fictional characters from New Jersey
Fictional New York City Police Department detectives
Fictional New York City Police Department lieutenants
Fictional pornographic film actors
Marvel Comics male characters
Marvel Comics orphans
Marvel Comics police officers
Punisher characters